Autoroute 55 (also called Autoroute de l'Énergie north of the Autoroute 20 and Autoroute Joseph-Armand Bombardier south of it) is an important north–south Autoroute and the only one running in that direction in central Quebec. It is the longest north-south Autoroute, beginning as the continuation of I-91 at the Canada–United States border near Stanstead and continuing to Shawinigan, where it downgrades to Route 155.

Route description
Autoroute 55 connects the mid-sized communities of Magog, Sherbrooke, Drummondville, Trois-Rivières, and Shawinigan and the smaller communities in between. The most notable feature on A-55 is the Laviolette Bridge between Trois-Rivières and Bécancour, which is one of the longest bridges in Quebec and in Canada.

A-55 had a short "gap" between Bécancour and Drummondville until October 2006. The gap resulted from Transports Quebec's original intention of bringing A-55 southeast towards Victoriaville along what is now Autoroute 955 before shifting southwest to rejoin existing A-55 near Richmond. However, plans changed in the 1970s, and the present routing was chosen. The southern section was originally supposed to be Autoroute 51 and was intended to continue to the planned extension of Autoroute 30 in Pierreville. A-55 was signed along Route 155 (which is not an Autoroute-standard highway) until the new route was completed.

All of the southern portion of A-55 became a full four-lane freeway by the end of October 2006.

The designation Autoroute Joseph-Armand Bombardier is in honour of Quebec businessman Joseph-Armand Bombardier, who lived in Valcourt, near where A-55 passes and who invented the snowmobile there. His company, Bombardier Inc., started by building snowmobiles and eventually grew into a major international manufacturer of transit vehicles and aircraft.

The designation Autoroute de l'Énergie means "Energy Highway" since it provides access to the Gentilly Nuclear Generating Station in Bécancour and the hydroelectric facilities in Shawinigan and the Haut-Saint-Maurice area, but the section north of A-30 is likely to remain at its comparatively short length to Shawinigan for the foreseeable future.

Exit list

Gallery

References

External links 

 A-55 at motorways-exits.com
 A-55 at Quebec Autoroutes
 Transports Quebec Map

55
Interstate 91
Transport in Drummondville
Transport in Magog, Quebec
Transport in Shawinigan
Transport in Sherbrooke
Transport in Trois-Rivières